Ivan Pereira (born 1 June 1964) is an Indian bishop, currently serving as the 3rd Bishop of Roman Catholic Diocese of Jammu–Srinagar.

Early life
Pereira was born on 1 June 1964 in Vasai, Mumbai, the son of Albert and Santan Pereira. Ivan Pereira joined the Jammu-Srinagar Diocese in year 1984.

Education 
Ivan completed his Minor Seminary from St. John's Minor Seminary, Amritsar. He completed his education of Philosophy from Holy Trinity Regional Seminary, Jalandhar. He completed his regency at St. Mary's Cathedral, Jammu.  He completed Theology from St. Joseph's Regional Seminary, Allahabad.

Priesthood
Ivan was ordained a Catholic Priest on 15 May 1993 for the Diocese of Jammu-Srinagar. Pereira has held a number of different positions in his diocese. He has been rector of St Paul's Minor Seminary, Akalpur, Jammu, Secretary of the Regional Catholic Council, Vicar, and Secretary to his predecessor Bishop Peter Celestine, OFM, Cap. He served as a Principal of Burn Hall School, Srinagar.

He was the parish priest of Our Lady of Fatima Church in Bishnah from 2009-2012. Since 2012, he served as the principal of the Burn Hall Higher Secondary School in Srinagar.

In addition, he was the diocesan and regional director of Indian Christian Youth Association, secretary and president of the Regional Conference of Diocesan Priests, North India, and the director of the Diocesan Education Board.

Episcopate 
Pope Francis appointed Pereira as Bishop of Roman Catholic Diocese of Jammu–Srinagar on 21 February 2015. He was ordained a bishop by Salvatore Pennacchio and the ceremony took place at Gandhi Nagar, Jammu.  He is the 3rd bishop of Roman Catholic Diocese of Jammu–Srinagar.

On his episcopal ordination he choose the motto : "Pax Nuntiata Est" (Peace Through Proclamation). 

Bishop Ivan Pereira succeeded Bishop Peter Celestine, who resigned after reaching the retirement age of 75.

See also 
List of Catholic bishops of India

References

External links

1964 births
Living people
21st-century Roman Catholic bishops in India
Christian clergy from Mumbai
Bishops appointed by Pope Francis
Jammu and Kashmir

People from Mumbai